Kelly Rowland is an American singer who began her career with the R&B girl group Destiny's Child, one of the world's best-selling girl groups of all time. During the group's hiatus, Rowland released her debut solo album Simply Deep in 2002, which included the worldwide number-one single "Dilemma" with American rapper Nelly, and "Stole". which reached the top 10 in several countries. The album was a commercial success; it was certified gold by the Recording Industry Association of America (RIAA), and sold more than 2.5 million copies worldwide. Following the disbandment of Destiny's Child in 2005, Rowland released her second solo album Ms. Kelly in 2007, which spawned the singles "Like This" and "Work". In 2009, Rowland scored her second worldwide number-one hit with French DJ David Guetta, on his single "When Love Takes Over". Her third album Here I Am was released in 2011. It spawned the international top-ten singles "Commander" and "Down for Whatever", as well as the US R&B/Hip-Hop number-one "Motivation".

In 2003, Rowland received eight nominations and won five for the single "Dilemma", including Hot Rap Track of the Year at the Billboard R&B/Hip-Hop Awards, Favorite International Single at the Capital FM Awards, Record of the Year and Best Rap/Sung Collaboration at the 45th Grammy Awards, and Best R&B Video at the MTV Video Music Awards, among others. The success of "When Love Takes Over" garnered Rowland more nominations throughout 2009 and 2010, winning two for Best Pop Dance Track at the International Dance Music Awards, and Best International DeeJay Favorite at the Danish DeeJay Awards. In 2011, she received six nominations and won two for Song of the Year for "Motivation" at the Soul Train Music Awards, and Ultimate TV Personality at the Cosmopolitan Ultimate Women of the Year Awards, for her role as a judge and mentor on The X Factor UK. Rowland has won four Grammy Awards, including three as a Destiny's Child member and one as a solo artist. Overall, she has won 25 awards from 72 nominations.

Film, television and image

Cosmopolitan Ultimate Women of the Year Awards 
The Cosmopolitan Ultimate Women of the Year Awards is an annual awards show by Cosmopolitan UK magazine. Rowland has won one award.

Glamour Women of the Year Awards 
The Glamour Women of the Year Awards is an annual awards show by Glamour UK magazine. Rowland has won one award.

NAACP Image Awards

Music

American Music Awards 
The American Music Awards is an annual awards ceremony created by Dick Clark in 1973. Rowland has been nominated once.

ASCAP Awards

ASCAP Pop Music Awards 
The ASCAP Pop Music Awards is an annual awards show by the American Society of Composers, Authors and Publishers (ASCAP), that honors songwriters in pop music. Rowland has received five awards from the company as a member of Destiny's Child and one award as a songwriter.

ASCAP Rhythm and Soul Music Awards 
The ASCAP Rhythm & Soul Music Awards is an annual awards show by the American Society of Composers, Authors and Publishers (ASCAP), that honors songwriters in hip-hop, R&B and soul music. Rowland has received three awards from the company as a member of Destiny's Child.

ASCAP Women Behind the Music Awards 
The ASCAP Women Behind the Music Awards is an annual awards show by the American Society of Composers, Authors and Publishers (ASCAP), that recognizes the contributions made by women in the music industry. Rowland was honored for her contributions to music in 2010.

BET Awards 
The BET Awards were established in 2001 by the Black Entertainment Television network to celebrate African Americans and other minorities in music, acting, sports, and other fields of entertainment. Rowland has been nominated once.

Billboard Awards

Billboard Music Awards 
The Billboard Music Awards is sponsored by Billboard magazine and held annually in May. The awards are based on sales data by Nielsen SoundScan and radio information by Nielsen Broadcast Data Systems. Rowland has won one award.

Billboard R&B/Hip-Hop Awards 
The Billboard R&B/Hip-Hop Awards reflects the performance of recordings on the Hot R&B/Hip-Hop Songs and Hot Rap Songs charts. Rowland has won one award.

Capital FM Awards 
The Capital FM Awards is an awards show in the United Kingdom held by the radio station Capital that recognizes music releases from local and international artists. Rowland has won one award.

Danish DeeJay Awards 
The Danish DeeJay Awards is an annual awards ceremony that celebrates the clubscene in Denmark. Rowland has won one award from two nominations.

Fitness Magazine

Gospel Touch Music Awards 

|-
| align="center"| 2014
| Say Yes (with Michelle Williams and Beyoncé)
| Song of the year
| 
|-

Grammy Awards
The Grammy Awards are awarded annually by the National Academy of Recording Arts and Sciences. Rowland has won five awards from eighteen nominations. Three of those five wins came from being a member of Destiny's Child.

Hollywood Walk of Fame

International Dance Music Awards 
The International Dance Music Awards is an awards show for dance and electronic music releases. Rowland has won one award from four nominations.

MOBO Awards 
The MOBO Awards (an acronym for Music of Black Origin) are held annually in the United Kingdom to recognize artists of any race or nationality performing music of black origin. Rowland has been nominated twice.

MTV Awards

MTV Video Music Awards 
The MTV Video Music Awards was established in 1984 by MTV to celebrate the top music videos of the year. Rowland has been nominated twice.

MTV Europe Music Awards 
The MTV Europe Music Awards was established in 1994 by MTV Europe to celebrate the most popular music videos from European and international artists. Rowland has been nominated once.

MTV Video Music Awards Japan 
The MTV Video Music Awards Japan was established in 2002 to celebrate the most popular music videos from Japanese and international artists. Rowland has been nominated once.

MVPA Awards 

The MVPA Awards are annually presented by a Los Angeles-based music trade organization to honor the year's best music videos.

|-
| rowspan="2" | 2013
| rowspan="2" | "Kisses Down Low"
| Best Make-Up
| 
|-
| Best Hair
|

NAACP Image Awards 
The NAACP Image Awards are awarded annually by the American National Association for the Advancement of Colored People to honor outstanding people of color in film, television, music and literature. Rowland has been nominated twice.

NRJ Music Awards 
The NRJ Music Awards was established in 2000 by the French radio station NRJ to give out awards to popular musicians by different categories. Rowland has been nominated once.

Popjustice Readers' Poll

Soul Train Music Awards 
The Soul Train Music Awards is an annual awards ceremony that was established in 1987 to honor the best in African American music and entertainment. Rowland has won one award from five nominations.

Stellar Awards
The Stellar Awards is an annual awards show in the US, honoring Gospel Music Artists, writers, and industry professionals for their contributions to the gospel music industry. The Stellar Awards ranks high in status as the only gospel music television awards program syndicated in over 140 markets nationwide. Rowland has won one awards from three nominations as a featuring artist.

Teen Choice Awards 
The Teen Choice Awards was established in 1999 to honor the biggest achievements in music, movies, sports and television, as voted for by young people aged between 13 and 19. Rowland has been nominated once.

World Music Awards 
The World Music Awards is an international awards show that was established in 1989 to honor musicians based on their worldwide sales figures, which are provided by the International Federation of the Phonographic Industry (IFPI). Rowland has received seven nominations.

Philanthropy

amfAR

|-
| align="center"| 2022
| Herself
| Award of Courage
| 
|-

MTV Staying Alive Foundation

|-
| align="center"| 2008
| Herself
| MTV Staying Alive Global Ambassador
| 
|-

References

Rowland, Kelly
Awards